Kay Callard (10 November 1923 – 7 March 2008) was a Canadian film and television actress who spent most of her career in Britain. She was married to the actor Jack McNaughton. She was popular in the mid and late 1950s; in 1958 she appeared in eleven film and TV productions within that single year. However, her career declined sharply from 1962 onwards.

Filmography

References

External links
 

1923 births
2008 deaths
Canadian film actresses
Actresses from Toronto
20th-century Canadian actresses
Canadian expatriates in England